State Route 122 (abbreviated SR 122) is part of Maine's system of numbered state highways, located in the southern part of the state.

Route description
SR 122 begins at an intersection with SR 26 just south of Poland Spring.  The route heads east, past the southern edge of Range Ponds State Park and the Poland Spring Resort, before entering the town of New Gloucester in Cumberland County.  SR 122 passes through the northern edge of the town before re-entering Androscoggin County and the city of Auburn.  SR 122 passes over the Maine Turnpike (Interstate 95) without an interchange, then turns east to end at Danville Junction southwest of the city.  Access to the Turnpike is available via the nearby exit 75 interchange with US 202/SR 4/SR 100.

History
SR 122 has retained its routing since its original designation in 1925.

Junction list

References

External links

Floodgap Roadgap's RoadsAroundME: Maine State Route 122

122
Transportation in Cumberland County, Maine
Transportation in Androscoggin County, Maine